Clive Robertson  may refer to:

Clive Robertson (actor) (born 1965), British actor
Clive Robertson (artist) (born 1946), British-born Canadian artist
Clive Robertson (broadcaster) (born 1945), Australian journalist